The 2021–22 Alabama State Hornets basketball team represented Alabama State University in the 2021–22 NCAA Division I men's basketball season. The Hornets, led by second-year head coach Mo Williams, played their home games at the Dunn–Oliver Acadome in Montgomery, Alabama as members of the Southwestern Athletic Conference.

Previous season
The Hornets finished the 2020–21 season 4–14 in SWAC play to finish in eighth place. They were Ineligible for postseason due to APR violations.

Roster

Schedule and results 

|-
!colspan=12 style=| Non-conference regular season

|-
!colspan=9 style=| SWAC regular season

Sources

References

Alabama State Hornets basketball seasons
Alabama State Hornets
Alabama State Hornets basketball
Alabama State Hornets basketball